This is a list of episodes for the second season of the CBS-TV series Alice.

Broadcast history
The season originally aired Sundays at 9:30-10:30 pm (EST).

Episodes

References

1977 American television seasons
1978 American television seasons